Kuteinykove is an urban-type settlement in Donetsk Raion of Donetsk Oblast in eastern Ukraine, but was formerly administered under Amvrosiivka Raion. Population:

Demographics
Native language as of the Ukrainian Census of 2001:
 Ukrainian 10.73%
 Russian 88.68%
 Armenian 0.23%
 Belarusian 0.09%
 Moldovan (Romanian) 0.05%

References

Urban-type settlements in Donetsk Raion